Sebis may refer to:
Sebis, Iran
Sebiș, Romania